Mike Marino is an American make-up artist. He was nominated for an Academy Award in the category Best Makeup and Hairstyling for the film Coming 2 America. He did not win. Marino got his start as a make-up assistant on The Hunger Games: Mockingjay – Part 1.

Selected filmography 
 Coming 2 America (2021; co-nominated with Stacey Morris and Carla Farmer)

References

External links 

Living people
Year of birth missing (living people)
Place of birth missing (living people)
American make-up artists